This is a list of Canadian films which were released in 1990:

See also
 1990 in Canada
 1990 in Canadian television

External links
Feature Films Released In 1990 With Country of Origin Canada at IMDb

1990
1990 in Canadian cinema
Canada